Marko Perišić (born 25 January 1991) is a Bosnian professional footballer who plays as a defensive midfielder for Bosnian Premier League club Leotar.

Club career
Perišić had a spell at Austrian second tier side Kapfenberger SV in 2016.

Honours
Zrinjski Mostar
Bosnian Premier League: 2017–18

References

External links
Futbalnet profile
Fortuna Liga profile

1991 births
Living people
Footballers from Sarajevo
Association football midfielders
Bosnia and Herzegovina footballers
FK Slavija Sarajevo players
FK Spartaks Jūrmala players
Al-Ahly SC (Benghazi) players
FC ViOn Zlaté Moravce players
Kapfenberger SV players
HŠK Zrinjski Mostar players
NK Čelik Zenica players
FK Olimpik players
FK Leotar players
Premier League of Bosnia and Herzegovina players
Latvian Higher League players
Slovak Super Liga players
2. Liga (Austria) players
Libyan Premier League players
Bosnia and Herzegovina expatriate footballers
Expatriate footballers in Latvia
Bosnia and Herzegovina expatriate sportspeople in Latvia
Expatriate footballers in Libya
Bosnia and Herzegovina expatriate sportspeople in Libya
Expatriate footballers in Slovakia
Bosnia and Herzegovina expatriate sportspeople in Slovakia
Expatriate footballers in Austria
Bosnia and Herzegovina expatriate sportspeople in Austria